Héjj Dávid Ádám (born in 1983) is a Hungarian sociologist and politician. He is a member of National Assembly of Hungary (Országgyűlés) since May 8, 2018. He was elected through the platform of Fidesz. He has been a member of the Legislative Committee of the National Assembly since 11 May.

References 

Living people
1983 births
Hungarian politicians
21st-century Hungarian politicians
Fidesz politicians
Members of the National Assembly of Hungary (2018–2022)